Tascia finalis is a moth of the family Zygaenidae. It is known from South Africa.

References

Endemic moths of South Africa
Procridinae
Moths of Africa
Moths described in 1854